The Acali was a raft which was used in the Acali Expedition or Acali Experiment. It has also been nicknamed the Sex Raft. The raft had a complement of eleven people: five men and six women. It left Las Palmas, Spain on 12 May 1973 and took 101 days to drift across the Atlantic Ocean and reach Cozumel, Mexico, with a single stopover in Barbados. The experiment was conceived by Mexican anthropologist Santiago Genovés (who had previously been a crew member of Thor Heyerdahl's Ra expedition) to investigate interpersonal relationships in conditions of limited space and social isolation. The participants showed a restraint towards aggression which created frustration within Genovés and led him to start to try to create conflict, and at one point he took command of the float. Despite these attempts, the group remained peaceful.

The raft
The name of the raft, Acali, comes from the Nahuatl language and means "the house on the water".

The raft was built specifically for the experiment. It had a steel hull and dimensions of 12 by 7 metres. The cabin measured 4 x 4 metres in area. It was designed by José Antonio Mandri and Colin Mudie, and built in Newcastle, UK.

Participants
Santiago Genovés Tarazaga (49 years old, male), Mexican anthropologist who devised the experiment.
José María Montero Pérez (34 years old, male), Uruguayan anthropologist and former student of Genovés.
Servane Zanotti (32 years old, female), French, responsible for conducting a study on pollution, scuba diver.
Charles Anthony (37 years old, male), Greek Cypriot, radio operator.
Rachida Mazani (23 years old, female), Algerian, responsible for conducting a study on pollution.
Mary Gidley (36 years old, female), American, with some knowledge of navigation. 
Fé Evangelina Seymour (23 years old, female), American, radio operator. 
Maria Björnstam (30 years old, female), captain of the expedition, Swedish. 
Edna Jonas (32 years old, female), a Czechoslovak resident in Israel, doctor.
Bernardo Bongo (29 years old, male), Angolan priest.
Eisuke Yamaki (29 years old, male), Japanese,  cameraman.

See also
 Stanford prison experiment (1971)

References

Anthropology
Research vessels
Science experiments
1973 in science